Physics in Perspective is a quarterly peer-reviewed academic journal published by Birkhäuser. It covers historical, philosophical, and social scientific perspectives of physics. The editors-in-chief are Joseph D. Martin (Durham University) and Richard Staley (University of Cambridge).

History
The journal was established in 1999 by John S. Rigden and Roger H. Stuewer, "to recognize historical and philosophical studies as essential to understanding the foundations of physics, to appreciating the diffusion of physics into all areas of science, and to conveying the cultural influence of physics on the arts and humanities."

Abstracting and indexing 
The journal is abstracted and indexed by:

According to the Journal Citation Reports, the journal has a 2017 impact factor of 0.625.

References

External links 
 

History of science journals
Physics journals
Quarterly journals
Springer Science+Business Media academic journals
English-language journals
Publications established in 1999